The Australasian Safari was an off-road motor sport racing event held in Australia between 1985 and 2014.

History
The Australasian Safari was first run in 1985 and held under the International Sporting Code of FIM and from 1999,  the General Competition Rules of Motorcycling Australia.

It was usually held around the end of August, in the Australian winter, and covered approximately 5,500 kilometres, mostly through the Outback in just over a week. Like the Dakar Rally, the vehicle classes involved were motorcycles and cars, however there were no truck class. From 2008, a quad class was introduced.

The event grew in size and scope for the first few years. In 1988, Australia's Bicentennial year, the event was tagged "The Big One" and was expanded to cover 10,000 km in 15 days, with a start in Alice Springs and traveling across the Tanami Desert, through the Kimberley region into Darwin, across the Gulf Country of far northwest Queensland and an eventual finish in Sydney. Out of 196 starting vehicles, only 96 finished the race.

Initially known as the Wynn's Safari for commercial reasons, the event was renamed in 1989 to the Australian Safari, and to the Australasian Safari in 2008. From 2007 the event was hosted in Western Australia.

Between 1994 and 1997 the event was included in the FIA Cross-Country Rally World Cup. It was last held in 2014 after Tourism Western Australia withdrew its funding for the event.

Results

See also
 Baja 1000
 Budapest-Bamako
 Dakar Rally
 Finke Desert Race
 Offroad racing
 Plymouth-Banjul Challenge

References

External links
Australasian Safari Homepage
Detailed Report of 2002 Event - Off-Road.com

Motorcycle races
Rally raid races
Recurring sporting events established in 1985
Recurring sporting events disestablished in 2014
1985 establishments in Australia
2014 disestablishments in Australia
Motorsport in the Northern Territory
Motorsport in Western Australia
Motorcycle racing in Australia